Vernon Ah Kee (born 1967) is a contemporary Australian artist, political activist and founding member of ProppaNOW. Based primarily in Brisbane, Queensland, Ah Kee is an Aboriginal Australian man with ties to the Kuku Yalandji, Waanji, Yidinji and Gugu Yimithirr peoples in Queensland. His art practice typically focuses on his Aboriginal Australian identity and place within a modern Australian framework, and is concerned with themes of skin, skin colour, race, privilege and racism.  Ah Kee has exhibited his art at numerous galleries across Australia, including the Art Gallery of New South Wales (AGNSW) and the Museum of Contemporary Art Australia, and has also exhibited internationally, most notably representing Australia at the 2009 Venice Biennale and the 2015 Istanbul Biennial.

Ah Kee has a very diverse art practice, using a broad range of techniques and media such as painting, installation, photography and text-based art. He is particularly renowned for his manipulation of colonial language and imagery to highlight racial issues in Australia. His works are hosted in both public and private collections around the world.

In 2003, Ah Kee, along with other Indigenous Australian artists Richard Bell, Jennifer Herd and Joshua Herd, created ProppaNOW – an organisation dedicated to supporting urban Indigenous artists in Brisbane and combating cultural stereotypes.

Personal life and education

Vernon Ah Kee was born in Innisfail, Queensland, in 1967 to Merv and Margaret Ah Kee, who were Indigenous rights activists. Like most other Indigenous people in Australia, the family was not included in the population census until 1971. As well as his Aboriginal heritage, he also has some Chinese ancestry from his great-grandfather, but Ah Kee has stated that he identifies more with his Indigenous heritage, saying "I think of myself as a Rainforest Aboriginal, a Buma".

His family moved to Cairns when he was 12 years old, and Ah Kee sketched avidly at this time.  He attended only Catholic schools, in Cairns going to St Augustine's College (a Marist Brothers school).

After attending Cairns TAFE where he learned screen printing,Ah Kee started his Bachelor of Visual Art at Queensland College of Art in Brisbane in 1996. He majored in Contemporary Indigenous Australian art and earned his degree in 1998. He then went on to do honours in fine art from 1999 to 2000, and then completed a doctorate in fine art from 2001 to 2007. During his studies, he had two solo exhibitions hosted at his college's art gallery as part of his postgraduate work  – whitefella normal blackfella me in 2000 and con Text in 2007.

In 2014, his father died in a car accident. In 2017 Ah Kee drew Portrait of My Father, a task that he described as a "labour of love".

Ah Kee suffered a heart attack in 2016 but managed to recover in time for his 2017 exhibition Not an animal or a plant.

Career

Art practice 
While Ah Kee incorporates a broad range of different art mediums, from life drawings to video installations, a consistent theme across all of his artworks is his examination of racism in Australia. Ah Kee has said that his art practice has been influenced by a wide range of artists and styles, but most significantly by other Indigenous artists such as Kevin Gilbert, Trevor Nickolls, Richard Bell and Gordon Bennett, stating that "I can see my own life and history" in their artworks. In particular, Bell and Bennett's manipulation of colonial text and images encouraged him to broaden his art practice and experiment with media beyond drawing - the text art, in particular, is a common technique among ProppaNOW artists. He also credits the politics of Malcolm X and James Baldwin, two prominent African American activists, as early inspirations for both his art practice and personal activism, as well as Barbara Kruger's propaganda-inspired art.

Many of his text-based artworks ("word art") contain colonial language that have been manipulated and rewritten to create a secondary meaning, such as his 2003 austracism being a play on the word "ostracism", and 2009 becauseitisbitter appropriating a poem from American poet Stephen Crane to portray an Indigenous experience of contemporary Australia. It has been suggested that the black and white text introduces the concept of racial relations in Australia and that the word play makes the audience think more deeply on the issues represented. The Museum of Contemporary Art Australia described his text-based art as "...point[ing] to prejudices and agendas embedded in Australian society and politics. These puns and words-within-words fuse the history and language of colonisation with contemporary experiences and issues".

Ah Kee has also engaged with drawing and painting mediums to highlight the modern Indigenous experience. fantasies of the good (2004) is a series of 13 detailed charcoal life drawings of different members of Ah Kee's family, who are all identified by name. The series uses a mug-shot style and is suggested to reference the documentation of Indigenous Australians by some anthropologists in the twentieth century; the Indigenous people who were documented were unnamed and the works were rather referred to by numbers. Ah Kee wanted to convey Australia's history of racism and has stated that "These drawings and what they represent are my evidence". His 2012 portrait, I see deadly people: Lex Wotton, depicted the titular man through bold paint strokes. Ah Kee explained that Wotton's actions during the Palm Island Riots led to him being negatively misrepresented in the media, and the artist decided that "Lex should look bold and brave" in his portrait. His 2012 exhibition of large, detailed charcoal and crayon portraits featured in the exhibition Transforming Tindale at the State Library of Queensland was based on that library's collection of anthropological photographs taken by Norman Tindale, and included some of Ah Kee's relatives. 

Ah Kee has used video installation art, most notably in his exhibition Tall Man, to create confronting reflections of Australian racism. In Tall Man, Ah Kee collected and edited footage from the Palm Island riots, an event that occurred after the death of Indigenous man Cameron Doomadgee in police custody, and retold the controversial story from an Indigenous perspective. The installation played across four screens and juxtaposed a peaceful representation of Palm Island with the chaos of the riots, concluding with footage of protesters holding up signs with Christian-related statements such as "Thou shalt not covet the land no more". Maura Reilly suggests this was to reference the hypocrisy of white Australian Christians in their treatment of Indigenous peoples.

His recent work, the island, also features a video installation, in which Ah Kee highlights Australia's "brutal" immigration system through the recounting of an Afghani refugee couple's story, rather than wholly focusing on the experiences of Indigenous Australians.

proppaNOW 

Along with  Richard Bell, Jennifer Herd and Joshua Herd, all artists based in Brisbane, Ah Kee is a founding member of proppaNOW. Bell had stated in 2002: "Aboriginal art – its a white thing", saying that the industry was controlled by white people, a sentiment echoed by Ah Kee. The ProppaNOW artists seek to refute the white belief that remote Indigenous Australians are the only true Aboriginal people, and to re-establish the presence of urban Indigenous people in society. The founding members created the organisation after the government's Queensland Indigenous Artists Marketing Export Agency (QIAMEA) appeared to focus more on Indigenous artists from rural communities than on those from urban areas.

At a Canberra proppaNOW exhibition in 2007, Ah Kee displayed his artwork You Deicide. Senior Curator at the National Museum of Australia, Margo Neale, suggested that the work's deliberate misuse of deicide was a comment on the role of Christian-based religions in the "cultural terrorism" of Aboriginal people, and that the manipulation of colonial language in the work was a common "tactical device used by the proppaNOW artists".

Dark + Disturbing
Dark + Disturbing is a curatorial project by Ah Kee. In August 2015, he mounted the exhibition Dark + Disturbing: Gordon Hookey for proppaNOW at the Cairns Indigenous Art Fair, featuring the work of fellow collaborator in proppaNow, Gordon Hookey.

Reception

Reviews and criticisms of his art 
Ah Kee has generally received positive reviews of his art, often being praised for his clever reinventions of colonial language to highlight racism in Australia and noted for the dual personal and political nature of his art. His Tall Man exhibition, a video and text installation of the Palm Island Riots, was called a "smartly composed yet painful examination of racial relations in Australia" by Art Asia Pacific Magazine.

Art critic and broadcaster Andrew Frost reviewed some of Ah Kee's works at the Sydney Festival and quotes the artist: "this is not history, this is my life" and "this is not political, it's personal". Frost gave particular praise for the artist's charcoal drawings of his family, the form referencing the documentation of Indigenous peoples by 20th century anthropologists, finding that Ah Kee was personalising a traditionally impersonal genre.

When Ah Kee was awarded the Redlands Konica Minolta Art Prize, one of the judges, National Art School curator Judith Blackall, also noted the dual political and personal nature of Ah Kee's work and how it impacts the audience. In regard to his portrait of Lex Wotton, she stated that “Vernon’s masterful drawing technique of charcoal and acrylic paint on canvas goes from strength to strength. This portrait is particularly powerful as it shows Lex Wotton – who the artist knows well as he is married to Vernon’s cousin – in profile, with an intense gaze. Importantly, the story behind the portrait is of great significance, both personally for the artist and politically for Australia".

In Ah Kee's 2020 exhibition, The Island, Andrew Brooks suggested that the show was criticising the romanticised, white settler mythology of Australia and was trying to remind the audience of Australia's indigenous presence. Unlike Frost, Brooks determined the inclusion of the Yuendumu doors to be "a powerful statement about the continuity of Indigenous sovereignty in this country", especially in their juxtaposition with the Walpiri Dreamtime paintings. Brooks judged that the contrast between the racist graffiti of Yuendumu doors and the "vibrant" Dreamtime paintings indicated that indigenous culture was more than what white Australian culture limited it to be.

Awards 
In 2012, Ah Kee was a finalist for the Art Gallery of New South Wales' Archibald Prize with his portrait I see deadly people: Lex Wotton. Wootton man is Ah Kee's cousin-in-law and was a key figure in the Palm Island Riots of 2004. In the same year, Ah Kee was also awarded Visual Artist of the Year in the Deadly Awards, the National Aboriginal & Torres Strait Islander
Music, Sport, Entertainment & Community Awards.

In 2014, the  Redlands Konika Minolta established artist prize was awarded to Ah Kee for his charcoal rendition of Lex Wotton.

In 2018, Ah Kee was awarded a Visual Arts Fellowship by the Australia Council for the Arts. Ah Kee planned to use his fellowship grant to exhibit his work in England and at other galleries abroad, as well as to produce new artworks.

Media
In 2020 Ah Kee featured as one of six Indigenous artists in the ABC TV series This Place: Artist Series. The series is a partnership between the Australian Broadcasting Corporation and the National Gallery of Australia, in which the producers travelled to the countries of "some of Australia's greatest Indigenous artists to share stories about their work, their country, and their communities".

Exhibitions 
, Ah Kee had displayed his art at 30 solo exhibitions and 100 group exhibitions, all around the world. He continues to create and exhibit his art in 2020, with plans to exhibit more of his work abroad. His exhibitions include:

In 2010 Vernon Ah Kee was interviewed in a digital story and oral history for the State Library of Queensland's James C Sourris AM Collection. In the interview Ah Kee talks to journalist Daniel Browning about his art, his family, the artist group proppaNOW, and being an Aboriginal artist.

References

Further reading

External Links 

 Vernon Ah Kee digital story, educational interview and oral history. John Oxley Library, State Library of Queensland, 6 December 2010, 6min, 30min and 2hour version available to view online.
 Portrait of an artist: Vernon Ah Kee. State Library of Queensland. In this Portrait of an artist event, Griffith University Art Museum Director, Angela Goddard discusses sits down in conversation with artist Vernon Ah Kee.

1967 births
Living people
Artists from Queensland
21st-century Australian male artists
Australian Aboriginal artists